Gregory Edwin Thompson (born 1956) is a retired Australian Anglican bishop. From 2014 to 2017 he was the Bishop of Newcastle. He was previously, from 2007 to 2013, the Bishop of the Northern Territory.

Early life and education
Thompson was born in Muswellbrook, New South Wales, Australia. He studied at the University of Newcastle. He trained for ordained ministry at Ridley College, an Evangelical Anglican theological college in Melbourne.

Ordained ministry
Thompson was ordained in 1986. From 1988 to 1994, he was Parish Priest of Darwin in the Northern Territory. Then, from 1994 to 1999, he was the New South Wales State Secretary of the Bush Church Aid Society. Having returned to parish ministry, he was Rector of St John's Church, Darlinghurst in Sydney between 1999 and 2004, and then Rector of St John's Church in Canberra.

Thompson was ordained to the episcopate on 31 May 2007 at Christ Church Cathedral, Darwin. He then became the Bishop of the Northern Territory. In September 2012, he was elected as the next Bishop of Newcastle. He took up the appointment on 2 February 2013, becoming the 13th Bishop of Newcastle. Thompson concluded his ministry on 31 May 2017. His farewell service was held in Christ Church Cathedral Newcastle on 21 May 2017.

Personal life
Thompson is married to Kerry.

In 2015, Thompson reported that he had been sexually abused by Ian Shevill as a young man when he was 19 and interested in the priesthood. Shevill has been identified as a sexual predator by the Royal Commission into Institutional Responses to Child Sexual Abuse in 2016.

See also

 Brian Farran
 List of Bishops of Newcastle

References 

1956 births
People from Upper Hunter Shire Council
Alumni of Ridley College, Melbourne
Anglican bishops of the Northern Territory
Bishops of Newcastle
21st-century Anglican bishops in Australia
Living people
University of Newcastle (Australia) alumni